Glen William Bell Jr. (September 3, 1923 – January 16, 2010) was an American entrepreneur who founded the Taco Bell chain of restaurants.

Biography
Glen Bell was born in Lynwood, California, to Glen William Bell Sr. and Ruth Elizabeth Bell (née Johnson). His parents were born in the Midwest with his mother having been born in Kandiyohi County, Minnesota and his father in Franklin County, Iowa. Bell's mother Ruth was born to a half Swedish father and a predominantly English mother. His father Glen Sr. was born to a German father and predominantly English mother, Glen also had colonial New England ancestry through both his parents families. Bell graduated from San Bernardino High School in 1941. He served in the U.S. Marine Corps as a cook during World War II. After the Marines he started his first hot dog stand 'Bell's Drive-In', in San Bernardino in 1948. In 1952, he sold the hot dog stand and built a second location selling hot dogs and hamburgers. He soon started selling tacos at a taco stand named Taco-Tia at 19 cents each from a side window. Between 1954 and 1955, he opened three Taco Tias in the San Bernardino area, eventually selling those restaurants and opening four El Tacos with a partner in the Long Beach area. He partnered with John Galardi, originally hired as a part time worker and then a manager. Galardi later founded the Wienerschnitzel hot dog chain.

Glen Bell learned how to make tacos from the Mitla Café in San Bernardino.

In 1962, he went solo and sold the El Tacos to his partner and opened his first Taco Bell in Downey, California. Bell franchised his restaurant in 1964. His company grew rapidly, and the 868-restaurant chain was later sold to PepsiCo in 1978 for $125 million in stock.

West Side and Cherry Valley Railroad 
In the late 1970s, Bell opened a tourist railroad at Tuolumne, California. This  gauge railroad used the lower section of the track and several steam locomotives of the West Side Lumber Company railway. The operation offered boat rides on the old mill pond and RV parking. In the initial plan, there were themed areas of the park with restaurants and stores. Glen Bell was able to locate and purchase old equipment (trains, cars, water towers, etc.) that were used in logging operations and brought to the park. It closed in the early 1980s after falling traffic.

The property was eventually sold off to the Tuolumne tribe of the Mi Wuk Indians who have developed the land including event grounds that have hosted big name concerts including Pat Benatar, Melissa Etheridge, Smokey Robinson, Peter Frampton, Bad Company and other touring acts.

Death 
Bell died from Parkinson's disease on January 16, 2010, at age 86 in Rancho Santa Fe, California, leaving his wife, Martha, two sons, one daughter, four grandchildren, and three sisters.

References

American food company founders
Fast-food chain founders
Taco Bell
Businesspeople from California
1923 births
2010 deaths
United States Marine Corps personnel of World War II
People from Lynwood, California
People from Rancho Santa Fe, California
20th-century American businesspeople
American people of English descent
American people of German descent
American people of Swedish descent
Deaths from Parkinson's disease
Neurological disease deaths in California